The Last Guardian may refer to:

The Last Guardian, a 2016 video game
The Last Guardian (novel), a 1989 novel
Warcraft: The Last Guardian, a 2002 novel
Last Guardian of Everness, a 2004 novel
Artemis Fowl: The Last Guardian, a 2012 novel